A Storm, a 1922 pastel painting by Georgia O'Keeffe, shows lightning over a lake and the reflection of the moon, while alluding to a feminine body shape. The medium is pastel on paper, mounted on illustration board.

The painting is part of a collection of work depicting sea- and landscapes of Maine or Lake George, and were created by O'Keeffe between 1921 and 1922. The technique and style of A Storm reflects O'Keeffe's earlier preference for charcoal as a medium. It was donated to the Metropolitan Museum of Art by a private collector in 1981.

Notes

References

Paintings by Georgia O'Keeffe
Paintings in the collection of the Metropolitan Museum of Art
1922 paintings
Water in art